Liisa Merisalu (born 15 January 2002) is an Estonian footballer who plays as a forward for the Estonia women's national team.

Career
She made her debut for the Estonia national team on 28 February 2019 against Lithuania, coming on as a substitute for Kristina Bannikova. As of May 2020, she was playing football in Finland for Nummelan Palloseura.

References

2002 births
Living people
Women's association football forwards
Estonian women's footballers
Estonia women's international footballers
Estonian expatriate footballers
Expatriate footballers in Finland
Estonian expatriate sportspeople in Finland
Nummelan Palloseura players